Red Hat, Inc. is an American software company that provides open source software products to enterprises.

Presidents and CEOs 
Since its foundation in 1995, Red Hat leadership has consisted of a president and CEO.

References 

Red Hat